is the first single of the Hello! Project duo, W. It was released on May 19, 2004 on the zetima label. All three tracks are covers of songs originally recorded by The Peanuts; tracks 2 and 3 are exclusive to this single.

Track listings
CD
  - 2:56
  - 3:00
  - 2:01
  - 2:53

DVD

Personnel
 Lyrics: Iwatani Tokiko
 Composer: Miyagawa Hiroshi
 Arrangement: Suzuki "Daichi" Hideyuki
 Catalog No.: EPCE-5288 (CD), EPBE-5130 (DVD)

External links
 UP-FRONT WORKS W discography entries: CD, DVD

2004 songs
2004 debut singles
W (group) songs
Zetima Records singles
Song recordings produced by Tsunku